The Pontificio Collegio Filippino (English: Pontifical Filipino College; Filipino: Dalubhasaang Pilipinong Pontipikal), officially named the Pontificio Collegio Seminario de Nuestra Señora de la Paz y Buen Viaje (English: Pontifical College Seminary of Our Lady of Peace and Good Voyage; Latin: Seminarii Sanctae Mariae de Pace, et in Collegio S. Bon Voyage), is a college for diocesan priests from the Philippines studying at pontifical universities in Rome, Italy.

It was formally established as an institution with pontifical rights by Pope John XXIII on June 29, 1961, through the papal bull Sancta Mater Ecclesia.

The current rector is the Rev. Fr. Gregory Ramon D. Gaston, S.Th.D.

History
Cardinal Rufino Santos proposed establishing the college during the meeting of the Catholic Bishops' Conference of the Philippines on January 26–31, 1959. His plan was supported by the Philippine bishops and approved by the Vatican. 

On August 8, 1959, Pope John XXIII personally blessed the cornerstone for the building in the private study of his summer residence at Castel Gandolfo. Cardinal Santos and Philippine Ambassador to the Holy See, José María Delgado, witnessed the event. 

The following day, Cardinal Giuseppe Pizzardo laid the cornerstone on the site of the edifice in the presence of 70 cardinals, diplomats, superiors general, seminary and university rectors and other distinguished personalities. Pope John XXIII blessed and inaugurated the modern edifice on October 7, 1961, the Feast of Our Lady of the Rosary.

Building
 
The Collegio is located at 490 Via Aurelia on a  lot between the Collegio Pio-Brasiliano and the Villa Pacelli, in a suburb of Rome. The four-story building was designed by Edoardo Cherubini in a 1960s contemporary design.

Design of the crypt chapel altar
In celebration of the canonization of Pedro Calungsod, the second Filipino saint, on October 21, 2012, a commemorative retablo was made by Filipino sculptor Wilfredo Layug from Betis, Guagua, Pampanga for the chapel at the crypt of the Collegio. It depicts both Calungsod and the first Filipino saint, Lorenzo Ruiz.

Ruiz was executed in Nagasaki, Japan in 1637, while Calungsod was killed together with Blessed Diego Luis de San Vitores in 1672 in Tumhon, Guam. In the mural of Calungsod, Layug carved the image of the Our Lady of Peace and Good Voyage, Patroness of the Pontificio Collegio Filippino.

Both relleba (relief murals) of the retablo depict both saints being tortured by pagans to force them to renounce their faith.

The angels are Filipina women garbed in baro and saya (native Filipino blouse and skirt), done in estofado, a detailed carving style that gives the image the look of real clothes. Bamboo is a constant motif in the retablo.

References

External links
 Official website

Roman Colleges
Catholic seminaries
Educational institutions established in 1961
Catholic Church in the Philippines
Seminaries and theological colleges in the Philippines
1961 establishments in Italy